Jordan competed at the 1988 Summer Paralympics in Seoul, South Korea. 7 competitors from Jordan won no medals and so did not place in the medal table.

See also 
 Jordan at the Paralympics
 Jordan at the 1988 Summer Olympics

References 

Jordan at the Paralympics
1988 in Jordanian sport
Nations at the 1988 Summer Paralympics